Moca Fútbol Club is a Dominican professional football team based in Moca, Dominican Republic, founded in 1971. The team plays in the Liga Dominicana de Fútbol (LDF).

History
The Moca FC is a professional football club of Dominican Republic located in Moca, Espaillat Province. Moca FC was the team with most championships in the defunct Major League (Amateur League that was predecessor of the Dominican Professional League), founded in 1971 and currently participates in the LDF, which has been the club with the longest soccer Current clubs of the LDF and this in turn has had the prowess of being the best cataloged Club so much so that it is denominated that its province is the "House of the Dominican Football".

Their classic rivals are Atlético San Cristóbal.

Stadiums
Estadio Don Bosco Moca (1971–14)
Estadio Bragaña García (2015)
Estadio Complejo Deportivo Moca 86 (2016–)

Achievements
Liga Mayor Coca-Cola: 3
 2010, 2012–13, 2014

Campeonato Nacional: 10
 1975, 1976, 1977, 1978, 1984, 1985, 1986, 1987, 1995, 1999

Current squad

Current staff
Head Coach:  Ronald Batista
Assistant Coach:  Fernando Paredes
Physical trainer:  Guillermo Gómez

External links
Balompiedominicano
Asociacion De Futbol Moca
Prensa Futbol Dominicano
Fifa.com
Futebol Central

 
1971 establishments in the Dominican Republic
Association football clubs established in 1971
Espaillat Province
Football clubs in the Dominican Republic